The Primera División de Fútbol Profesional Clausura 2001 season (officially "Torneo Clausura 2001") started on February 3, 2001, and finished on June 30, 2001.

The season saw C.D. Águila win its 13th league title after a 2–1 victory over C.D. FAS in the final.

It was also the last time El Salvador used promotion and relegation on a per-season basis. This saw C.D. San Luis become the last team to be relegated to the Segunda División de Fútbol Salvadoreño after competing in the first division for under six months. As of the following tournament (Apertura 2001), promotion and relegation were changed to once a year, and decided on aggregate points over both Apertura and Clausura seasons.

Team information

Further changes
Santa Clara sold their spot to San Luis for 75, 000 dollars.

Personnel and sponsoring

Managerial changes

During the season

Promotion and relegation
Promoted from Segunda División de Fútbol Salvadoreño as of February 3, 2001.
 C.D. San Luis

Relegated to Segunda División de Fútbol Salvadoreño as of June 30, 2001.
 C.D. San Luis

League standings

Semifinals 1st Leg

Semifinals 2nd Leg

Final

Final Rematch

List of foreign players in the league
This is a list of foreign players in Apertura 2001. The following players:
have played at least one apetura game for the respective club.
have not been capped for the El Salvador national football team on any level, independently from the birthplace

ADET
  Claudio Lozano
  Sergio Machado

C.D. Águila
  Adrian Mahia
  Rodinei Martins
  Mauro Nunez
  Marcio Sampaio
  Dario Larrosa

Alianza F.C.
  Eduardo Cocherari
  Raul Falero
  Carlos Villareal
  Alejandro Curbelo 
   Alejandro Larrea

Atletico Balboa
  Franklin Webster
  Luis Sergio Pereira
  Evandro Guimaraes
  Elvis Pererira
  Javier Vargas

Atletico Marte
  Emiliano Pedrozo
  Alex Machado
  Oscar Abreu
  Andres Ortega Mora

 (player released mid season)
  (player Injured mid season)
 Injury replacement player

Dragon
  Jorge Leonardo Garay
  Moisés Canalonga
  Williams Reyes
  Bruno Ferri
  John Gamboa

C.D. FAS
  Alejandro Bentos 
  Antonio Serrano
  Claudio Pasadi
  Pablo Quiñonez
  Alejandro Soler

C.D. Luis Ángel Firpo
  Percibal Piggot 
   Washington Hernández 
  Mauricio Dos Santos
  Raul Toro

Municipal Limeno
  Luis Alfredo Ramirez
  Gustavo Gallegos
   Jahir Camero

San Luis Talpa
  Gabriel Alvarez
  Walter Capozuchi
  Ramiro Zepeda
  José Alberto Solano
  Hugo Sarmiento
  Alfred Boden

Top scorers

References

External links

Primera División de Fútbol Profesional Clausura seasons
El
1